The Lifesaver is an album by pianist Joe Bonner which was recorded in 1974 and released on the Muse label.

Reception

The AllMusic review by Scott Yanow stated "This solo piano date is still one of Bonner's best. The influence of McCoy Tyner is strong but Bonner's six originals give the set an impressive amount of diversity and even at the relatively young age of 26, Joe Bonner had a lot to say. It is surprising that he has not become very well-known".

Track listing
All compositions by Joe Bonner
 "Bonner's Bounce" – 6:00
 "Tatoo" – 4:40
 "Little Chocolate Boy" – 6:08
 "The Lifesaver" – 5:32
 "Native Son" – 9:27
 "The Observer" – 3:15

Personnel
Joe Bonner – piano

References

Muse Records albums
Joe Bonner albums
1975 albums
Solo piano jazz albums